The ACBS Asian Under-21 Snooker Championship is the premier non-professional junior snooker tournament in Asia. The event series is sanctioned by the Asian Confederation of Billiard Sports and started from 1993. In most of the seasons, the winner of the tournament qualifies for the next season of the Professional Snooker Tour.

Winners 

cuetracker.net/tournaments/asian-under-21-championship

cuetracker.net/tournaments/asian-under-21-championship-women

Boys

Girls

Stats

Champions by country (Men's)

Champions by country (Women's)

See also
 World Snooker Tour

References

Snooker amateur competitions
Recurring sporting events established in 1993
1993 establishments in Asia
Snooker in Asia
Snooker, Under-21
Under-21 sport